Yuma can refer to:

Places
 Yuma Desert, desert in southwest U.S. and northwest Mexico
United States
 Yuma County, Arizona
 Yuma, Arizona
 Fortuna Foothills, Arizona
 Marine Corps Air Station Yuma
 United States Army Yuma Proving Ground
 Yuma Territorial Prison
 Fort Yuma, California
 Yuma County, Colorado
 Yuma, Colorado
 Yuma, Kansas
 Yuma, Kentucky
 Yuma, Michigan
 Yuma, Tennessee

Others
 Long Island, Bahamas, called Yuma by Native Arawak Indians over 500 years ago
 The Magdalena River, Colombia, also known as the Yuma River
 La Yuma / el Yuma, approbative name for the United States in Cuba
 Yuma (river), Dominican Republic

People
 Quechan, also called Yuma, a native people of Arizona
 Juma people, a native people of Brazil
 Suma Indians (Suma also spelled Yuma), a native people of Texas and Chihuahua, Mexico
 Yuma (footballer), born Javier Monsálvez Carazo, Spanish footballer
, Japanese professional wrestler
, Japanese actress
, Japanese swimmer
, Japanese footballer 
, Japanese long-distance runner
, Japanese footballer 
, Japanese actor
, Japanese footballer
, Japanese footballer 
, Japanese baseball player
, Japanese speed skater
 Japanese field hockey player
 Japanese singer and actor
 Japanese figure skater
 Japanese footballer 
 Japanese cyclist
 Japanese motorcycle racer
 Japanese para-badminton player
, Japanese footballer
, Japanese judoka
, Japanese baseball player
, Japanese footballer
, Japanese footballer
, Japanese voice actor and singer
, Japanese football player

Fictional characters

 Yuma Chitose, a fictional character in the manga, Puella Magi Oriko Magica
 Yuma Tonami, a fictional character in To Heart 2
 Yuma Tsukumo, a fictional character in Yu-Gi-Oh! Zexal
 Yuma Isogai, a fictional character in Assassination Classroom
 Yuma Lau, a fictional character in  Far Cry 4

Arts and entertainment
 Yuma (1971 film), TV film starring Clint Walker
 Yuma (2012 film), Polish film

Others
 USS Yuma, name of a number of U.S. Navy ships
 Yuma point, also called an Eden point, type of Paleo-Indian stone projectile point, first found in Yuma Count, Colorado
 Yuma War, armed conflict fought primarily between the United States and the Yuma people
 Yuma (moth), genus of moths in the subfamily Epipaschiinae

See also
Yoma
3:10 to Yuma (disambiguation)

Japanese masculine given names
Japanese unisex given names